Le Mirage may refer to:

Le Mirage (brothel), an open-air brothel in Curaçao
Le Mirage, a 1909 film directed by Louis Feuillade
Le Mirage, a 1912 film directed by Victorin-Hippolyte Jasset
Le Mirage, a 1992 film directed by Jean-Claude Guiguet
Le Mirage (2015 film), a Canadian film directed by Ricardo Trogi